Madison Square Garden in New York City has played host to many local, regional and international artists, spanning a wide range of musical genres.

1960s 
1967

1968

1969

1970s 
1970

1971

1972

1973

1974

1975

1976

1977

1978

1979

1980s 
1980

1981

1982

1983

1984

1985

1986

1987

1988

1989

1990s 
1990

1991

1992

1993

1994

1995

1996

1997

1998

1999

2000s 

2000

2001

2002

2003

2004

2005

2006

2007

2008

2009

2010s 
2010

2011

2012

2013

2014

2015

2016

2017

2018

2019

2020s 
2020

2021

2022

2023

Notes

References 

American entertainment-related lists
Entertainment events
Entertainment events in the United States
Events in New York City
Lists of events in the United States
Entertainment events at Madison Square Garden
Lists of events by venue